Watson Creek is a stream in Fillmore County, in the U.S. state of Minnesota.

Watson Creek was named for Thomas and James Watson, pioneer settlers.

The Minnesota Department of Natural Resources has designated 16.9 miles of Watson Creek as a trout stream.  It is populated with brook, brown, and rainbow trout.

See also
List of rivers of Minnesota

References

Rivers of Fillmore County, Minnesota
Rivers of Minnesota
Southern Minnesota trout streams
Driftless Area